Paras Madaan is an Indian television actor who shot to fame with the television series Kis Desh Mein Hai Meraa Dil on Star Plus and later known for the roles in the shows like Nisha Aur Uske Cousins and Qubool Hai. He is currently playing the role of Rajeev Chandra in famous Indian Drama Series, Beyhadh 2
Hero Wardiwala (ALT Balaji Webseries )

In the media
Paras Madaan was a theatre artist from Delhi. Paras has also done many commercial ads with MTV, Tata, Nestle Eclairs before his debut in acting. Madaan has debuted with Kis Desh Mein Hai Meraa Dil and later Keshav Pandit as a supporting actor. He shot the fame with the role of Anwar on Zee TV's popular long-running show Qubool Hai. He also got fame with the role of Sumit in Star Plus' Nisha Aur Uske Cousins replacing Tarun Singh.

Television shows 
 Beyhadh 2 as Rajiv Chandra
 Divya Drishti as Scorpion
 ALTBalaji (Hero Varrdiwala) as Naveen
 Half Marriage (TV series) as Sidhath Singhania
 Laado 2 as Jai Dev
 Jaat Ki Jugni as Dr. Vikram
 Sarojini - Ek Nayi Pehal as Mayank
 Love by Chance as Mihir
 Nisha Aur Uske Cousins as Sumit
 Keshav Pandit
 Kis Desh Mein Hai Meraa Dil
 Qubool Hai as Aanwar
 Chandrakant Chiplunkar Seedi Bambawala
 Hamari Sister Didi

References

21st-century Indian male actors
Indian male television actors
Living people
Indian male soap opera actors
Male actors in Hindi television
People from Delhi
1985 births
Male actors from Delhi